Johan II may refer to:

 Johan II, king of Sweden (1455–1513) Danish king who became king of Sweden during the Kalmar union 1497–1501
 Johan II of East Frisia (1538–1591)

See also
Johann II, Prince of Liechtenstein

de:Liste der Herrscher namens Johann#Johann II.